Matthew Mahoney may refer to:

Matthew Mahoney (footballer) (born 1968), former Australian rules footballer
Matt Mahoney (soccer) (born 1995), American soccer player
Matt Mahoney, a developer of PAQ